"Pushin' Weight" is a single by Ice Cube from his album War & Peace Vol. 1 (The War Disc) Produced by N.O. Joe. It features Mr. Short Khop. A music video was released and directed by Gregory Dark. "Pushin' Weight" charted at top of the Hot Rap Singles charting, twelve at Hot R&B Singles and twenty-six at Billboard.

Charts

Certifications

References

External links
Music video at MTV.com

Ice Cube songs
1998 singles
Music videos directed by Gregory Dark
Songs written by Ice Cube